The Cowal Highland Gathering (also known as the Cowal Games) is an annual Highland games held in the Scottish town of Dunoon, on the Cowal peninsula in Argyll and Bute, over the final weekend in August.

History

The first record of an organised Highland games in the town is in 1871, the same year as the Argyllshire Gathering in Oban started. In subsequent years games were held at New Year. The organisation of the Cowal events and other games around Scotland was due to a wide interest in Highland sports, partly stemming from Queen Victoria's love of Scotland.

The event that would evolve into the Cowal Gathering was first held on 11 August 1894, and organised by local man Robert Cameron. 

1906 saw the introduction of a pipe band competition for Army bands, at the suggestion of Malcolm McCulloch. 25 bands entered in 1909, the first year that civilian bands were allowed to compete. The Argyll Shield, donated in 1906 by Princess Louise, Duchess of Argyll, is still awarded to the winning band in the Grade 1 competition.

The easy access of Dunoon by paddle steamer from Glasgow contributed to popularity of the Games. The Games also featured in early BBC television broadcasts.

The global COVID-19 pandemic saw the cancelling of the highland gathering for 2020 and 2021, events normally attracting in excess of 1500 competitors annually.  This was due both to travel restrictions for international participants, as well as uncertainty health-wise.  A 'virtual gathering' was to be held for 2021, following a similar 2020 action.

Events

Pipe band competition

As the last major competition in the season, Cowal was historically where the Champion of Champions title for the best overall performance in the major competitions of the season was decided and awarded. Until the World Pipe Band Championships started in Glasgow in 1947, Cowal was regarded as the premier pipe band competition.

Following discussions between the Gathering Committee and the RSPBA, it was decided that after 2013 Cowal would lose its status as a major competition due to difficulties accommodating the number of bands. The pipe band competition continues to be held but with a reduced number of entrants.

Solo bagpipe competition
The Games hosts open graded pibroch, march, and strathspey and reel competitions, as well as juvenile and local restricted competitions.

Highland dancing competition

At the Games are held the Scottish National Highland Dancing Championships which is only open to Scottish residents, the Scottish (open) Highland Dancing Championships and the qualifiers and finals of the World Championships.

Sports
The Games features a variety of traditional Highland games events, including the shot put, caber toss, weight throw and hammer throw, as part of an international competition. The shot put is done with both a standard  shot and with the naturally formed  Cowal Stone.

There is a 5-kilometre fun run and a hill race from the stadium to the top of Tom Odhar and back again, and since 2007 there has been a Scottish Backhold wrestling competition.

References

External links
 
 British Pathe Newsreel Archives

Highland games
Sport in Argyll and Bute
Piping events
Recurring events established in 1894
Cowal
Tourist attractions in Dunoon
Highland games in Scotland
Multi-sport events in the United Kingdom
Festivals established in 1894
Sports festivals in Scotland